WWE Greatest Royal Rumble was a professional wrestling pay-per-view and livestreaming event produced by WWE. It was held for wrestlers from the promotion's Raw, SmackDown, and 205 Live brand divisions. The event took place on April 27, 2018, at the King Abdullah Sports City's King Abdullah International Stadium in Jeddah, Saudi Arabia. It was the first in a series of WWE events held in Saudi Arabia in support of Saudi Vision 2030, the country's social and economic reform program. At the event, all men's main roster championships at the time were defended, in addition to a 50-man Royal Rumble match, titled the Greatest Royal Rumble match.

The card comprised 10 matches. In the main event, Raw's Braun Strowman won the Greatest Royal Rumble match to win the WWE Greatest Royal Rumble Trophy and Championship. In the penultimate match, Brock Lesnar retained Raw's Universal Championship against Roman Reigns in a steel cage match. In other prominent matches, SmackDown's WWE Championship match between defending champion AJ Styles and Shinsuke Nakamura resulted in a double countout, The Undertaker defeated Rusev in a casket match, and in the opening bout, John Cena defeated Triple H. The Greatest Royal Rumble match was notable for being Chris Jericho's final match in WWE; Jericho had been employed with the company since 1999. After making a few appearances in New Japan Pro-Wrestling, Jericho became one of the first wrestlers to sign with All Elite Wrestling in 2019.

Production

Background

Since 1988, the Royal Rumble has been an annual January event held by the American professional wrestling promotion WWE, shown on pay-per-view (PPV) since 1989 and the WWE Network since 2015. The event is highlighted by the Royal Rumble match, a modified battle royal in which the participants enter at timed intervals instead of all beginning in the ring at the same time. The match generally features 30 wrestlers.

On March 5, 2018, WWE and the Saudi General Sports Authority advertised a live event titled the Greatest Royal Rumble to be held on April 27, 2018, at the King Abdullah International Stadium, part of the King Abdullah Sports City, in Jeddah, Saudi Arabia. The event was announced to feature the largest version of the Royal Rumble match to date, aptly named the Greatest Royal Rumble match, having a total of 50 participants, ousting the 2011 Royal Rumble's 40-man match. The event was the first in a 10-year strategic multi-platform partnership between WWE and the Saudi General Sports Authority in support of Saudi Vision 2030, Saudi Arabia's social and economic reform program.

On March 19, 2018, WWE scheduled matches for all seven of their main roster male championships across the Raw, SmackDown, and 205 Live brands at the time: Raw's Universal Championship, Intercontinental Championship, and Raw Tag Team Championship, SmackDown's WWE Championship, United States Championship, and SmackDown Tag Team Championship, and 205 Live's Cruiserweight Championship.  The event was streamed live on the WWE Network, as well as traditional pay-per-view in the United States and internationally. The event was also the first WWE pay-per-view with Arabic commentary.

In the weeks leading up to the event, WWE held tryouts in Saudi Arabia. From these tryouts, eight were selected to receive training by WWE, which would include an opportunity to earn a spot at the Greatest Royal Rumble event itself.

Storylines
The card comprised 10 matches that resulted from scripted storylines, where wrestlers portrayed villains, heroes, or less distinguishable characters in scripted events that built tension and culminated in a wrestling match or series of matches. Results were predetermined by WWE's writers on the Raw, SmackDown, and 205 Live brands, while storylines were produced on WWE's weekly television shows, Monday Night Raw, SmackDown Live, and the cruiserweight-exclusive 205 Live.

On April 9, Brock Lesnar, who had renewed his WWE contract, was scheduled to defend the Universal Championship against Roman Reigns in a steel cage match as a rematch from WrestleMania 34. On the Raw following WrestleMania, Reigns expressed frustration about not being told about his future matches and opponents, singling out the steel cage match with Lesnar. Reigns alleged that there was a conspiracy against him. Samoa Joe, who had been out with an injury since January, came out and warned Reigns that Lesnar would beat him again.

On March 26, WWE scheduled a ladder match between then-champion The Miz, Seth Rollins, Finn Bálor, and Samoa Joe for the Intercontinental Championship. At WrestleMania 34, The Miz lost the Intercontinental Championship to Rollins in a triple threat match that also included Bálor, thus making Rollins the defending champion. Both Miz and Joe were traded to SmackDown while Rollins and Bálor remained on Raw.

On March 26, Cesaro and Sheamus were scheduled to defend the Raw Tag Team Championship against The Hardy Boyz (Jeff Hardy and Matt Hardy). At WrestleMania 34, however, Cesaro and Sheamus lost the titles to Braun Strowman and 10-year-old Nicholas. The following night on Raw, Strowman and Nicholas relinquished the titles due to Nicholas being a fourth grader. Cesaro and Sheamus demanded their titles back, but Raw General Manager Kurt Angle instead scheduled them to face the winner of the four-team Tag Team Eliminator tournament for the vacant titles at the Greatest Royal Rumble. "Woken" Matt Hardy and Bray Wyatt won the tournament by defeating Titus Worldwide (Apollo Crews and Titus O'Neil) and The Revival (Dash Wilder and Scott Dawson). Cesaro and Sheamus were then traded to SmackDown during the Superstar Shake-up.

At WrestleMania 34, The Bludgeon Brothers (Harper and Rowan) defeated defending champions The Usos (Jey Uso and Jimmy Uso) and The New Day's Big E and Kofi Kingston in a triple threat tag team match to win the SmackDown Tag Team Championship. On the following SmackDown, The Usos defeated The New Day to earn a title match at Greatest Royal Rumble.

A match between John Cena and Triple H was scheduled on March 26. 

The Undertaker was originally scheduled to face Rusev in a casket match, the first match of its kind in three years. Due to reasons not entirely clear, Rusev was temporarily replaced by Chris Jericho — this was explained with Rusev's wife Lana complaining about her husband competing in a casket match — but eventually reinserted back into the match. Jericho was restored to his original participation in the Greatest Royal Rumble match.

At WrestleMania 34, Jinder Mahal won the United States Championship. Mahal was then traded to Raw and lost the championship to Jeff Hardy and Mahal invoked his rematch clause for the Greatest Royal Rumble. Hardy was then traded to SmackDown the following night.

At WrestleMania 34, AJ Styles successfully defended the WWE Championship against Shinsuke Nakamura. After the match, Nakamura showed his respect to Styles but then attacked him with a low blow and a Kinshasa, turning heel. On April 17, after repeated attacks on Styles by Nakamura, a rematch between the two was scheduled for the Greatest Royal Rumble.

On the WrestleMania 34 Kickoff pre-show, Cedric Alexander defeated Mustafa Ali in the WWE Cruiserweight Championship tournament final to win the vacant title. Two nights later on 205 Live, Buddy Murphy attacked Alexander during his celebration. Murphy was then scheduled to face Alexander for the title at the Greatest Royal Rumble, but he failed his mandatory weigh-in when he weighed 207 pounds, 2 pounds over the 205 pound weight limit. He was then removed from the match and banned from competing on 205 Live until he met the weight requirement. The following week, Kalisto earned a Cruiserweight Championship match at the Greatest Royal Rumble by winning a gauntlet match.

Event

Preliminary matches
The actual pay-per-view opened with John Cena facing Triple H. During the match, Cena performed an Attitude Adjustment on Triple H for a near-fall. Cena attempted another Attitude Adjustment but Triple H countered into a Pedigree for a near-fall. In the end, Cena performed a second Attitude Adjustment on Triple H, a catapult into the corner, and a third Attitude Adjustment to pick up the victory. Following the match, Cena thanked the Kingdom of Saudi Arabia for their hospitality, and expressed excitement over the event.

In the following match, Cedric Alexander defended the Cruiserweight Championship against Kalisto. The match ended when Alexander countered a Salida Del Sol attempt into a Lumbar Check to retain the title.

Next, the vacant Raw Tag Team Championship was contested between the team of Bray Wyatt and Matt Hardy and the former champions, Cesaro and Sheamus. In the end, Hardy distracted Sheamus, allowing Wyatt to perform a Sister Abigail on him. Hardy and Wyatt then performed a wheelbarrow Twist of Fate on Sheamus to win the titles.

Jeff Hardy then defended the United States Championship against Jinder Mahal. Hardy performed a Swanton Bomb on Mahal to retain the title.

After that, The Bludgeon Brothers defended the SmackDown Tag Team Championship against The Usos. Harper and Rowan retained the titles after performing The Reckoning on Jimmy Uso.

Next, Seth Rollins defended the Intercontinental Championship against Finn Balor, Samoa Joe and The Miz in a Ladder match. Near the end of the match, Balor attempted to retrieve the title, only for Rollins to springboard onto the ladder and retrieve the title belt, thus retaining the championship.

In a segment between matches, four prospects from the recent Saudi tryouts (including Mansoor) came out to the ring to introduce themselves. Cruiserweight Ariya Daivari and his brother Shawn Daivari, in his first WWE appearance since 2007, came out to interrupt them. The Saudi prospects attacked and cleared the Daivari brothers from the ring.

Later, AJ Styles defended the WWE Championship against Shinsuke Nakamura. During the match, Nakamura resorted to various illegal tactics, such as a low blow, increasingly frustrating Styles. In the end, both Nakamura and Styles fought outside of the ring, only for the match to end in a double countout. After the match, Styles performed a Phenomenal Forearm to the floor on Nakamura.

After that, The Undertaker fought Rusev (who was accompanied by Aiden English) in a Casket match. At the end of the match, Undertaker performed a chokeslam on Rusev and rolled him into the casket. Before Undertaker could close the casket, English attacked Undertaker, who retaliated with another chokeslam and a Tombstone Piledriver before putting English into the casket alongside Rusev and closing it for the victory.

In the penultimate match, Brock Lesnar accompanied by his advocate Paul Heyman defended the Universal Championship against Roman Reigns in a Steel Cage match. Lesnar started the match with four German suplexes and an F-5 onto Roman. After Roman countered another F-5 attempt, he performed three Superman Punches onto Lesnar, who quickly picked Roman up for an F-5 after a Spear attempt, which Roman countered to start climbing the cage. After both men failed to escape the cage, Roman performed a Powerbomb onto Lesnar from the top rope. Roman then performed three Spears onto Lesnar for a nearfall. Paul Heyman then stopped Roman from escaping the cage by slamming the door on him, which Brock used to perform a second F-5 for a nearfall. Heyman then threw a chair into the ring, which distracted Brock long enough for Roman to perform a fourth Spear for a nearfall. Roman then performed four chair shots onto Lesnar before hitting him with a Superman Punch, and then a fifth Spear onto Lesnar through the cage. Although Roman touched the floor with both feet first, the referee called for Lesnar to win the match as he technically escaped the cage first, to retain the Universal Championship.

Main event
Daniel Bryan and Dolph Ziggler began the 50-man Royal Rumble match as the first two entrants. Titus O'Neil  entered at No. 39 and tripped on his way to the ring. Bryan survived until the final three, beating Rey Mysterio for the longest time spent in a single Royal Rumble match of all time at an hour and sixteen minutes. In the end, Big Cass eliminated Bryan and attempted a big boot on Braun Strowman, who countered and eliminated Cass to win the match. Strowman also achieved the most eliminations of a single Royal Rumble match at 13, beating out a record previously held by Roman Reigns with 12. Post-match, Strowman received a trophy and the Greatest Royal Rumble Championship.

Controversy

WWE had been criticized for holding the event without female wrestlers, who were unable to perform at the event due to the limited rights women have in Saudi Arabia. Triple H, WWE's Executive Vice President of Talent, Live Events and Creative, responded to the criticism: "I understand that people are questioning it, but you have to understand that every culture is different and just because you don’t agree with a certain aspect of it, it doesn’t mean it’s not a relevant culture...You can’t dictate to a country or a religion about how they handle things but, having said that, WWE is at the forefront of a women’s evolution in the world and what you can’t do is effect change anywhere by staying away from it....While women are not competing in the event, we have had discussions about that and hope that, in the next few years they will be". Women were in attendance for the event, though only if accompanied by a male guardian. This was a major change from previous events, which were only open to men. Associated Press noted that this is due to "a series of social changes" by the Crown Prince Mohammad bin Salman. During the event, WWE aired a promotional video, which included WWE female wrestlers. The Saudi General Sports Authority issued an apology for "indecent material" that aired at the event.
	
In addition to the women, wrestler Sami Zayn did not participate in the event as Zayn is of Syrian descent, and Saudi Arabia has strained relations with Syria. On the Raw after the event, a storyline excuse was given in where Sami was suffering from vertigo given to him by Bobby Lashley and therefore couldn't compete.

Another subject of criticism was the situation of LGBT rights in Saudi Arabia, as in Saudi Arabia homosexual intercourse is illegal and can be punished by death.

Al-Qaeda in the Arabian Peninsula, a militant group offshoot of Al-Qaeda in Yemen, issued a warning to bin Salman and criticized the WWE event stating that "Disbelieving wrestlers exposed their privates and on most of them was the sign of the cross, in front of a mixed gathering of young Muslim men and women. The corruptors did not stop at that, for every night musical concerts are being announced, as well as movies and circus shows."

Results

Tag Team Eliminator bracket

Greatest Royal Rumble match entrances and eliminations
 – Raw
 – SmackDown
 – 205 Live
 – NXT
 – Hall of Famer (HOF)
 – Unbranded
 – Winner

 By eliminating 13 men, Braun Strowman broke the record of 12, set by Roman Reigns at the 2014 Royal Rumble.
 Daniel Bryan broke the longevity record for lasting 1:16:05, previous record held by Rey Mysterio (lasting 1:02:12) at the 2006 Royal Rumble.
Big Show and Kane were scheduled for the match but were pulled from the event due to injury.

Championship belt
At the conclusion of the Greatest Royal Rumble, Braun Strowman was awarded a trophy and the Greatest Royal Rumble Championship. According to The Sportster, "the likelihood is that nothing that took place in the main event will have any effect on anything once WWE arrives back in the United States and resume normal service." Although WWE.com had originally listed Strowman as the Greatest Royal Rumble Champion after the event, he never appeared with the championship at any other event and the title was never mentioned again.

The base design was similar to the current design of the WWE Championship introduced in 2014, with some differences. Instead of a large cut out of the WWE logo, the center plate was modeled with an Arabic pattern with the WWE logo in the center. Like the WWE Championship belt and other belts introduced since 2016, the Greatest Royal Rumble Championship belt contained two side plates, both separated by gold divider bars, with removable round sections that could be replaced with the current champion's logo; the default plates showed the official logo of Saudi General Sports Authority, which is identical to the national emblem of Saudi Arabia. The plates were on a green leather strap resembling the color of the national flag of Saudi Arabia.

See also

2018 in professional wrestling

References

External links
 

Entertainment events in Saudi Arabia
Royal Rumble
April 2018 events in Asia
2018 in Saudi Arabia
2018 WWE Network events
2018 WWE pay-per-view events
WWE championships
National professional wrestling championships
Professional wrestling controversies
WWE in Saudi Arabia